The Bavarian Order of Merit is the Order of Merit of the Free State of Bavaria. It is awarded by the Minister-President of Bavaria as a "recognition of outstanding contributions to the Free State of Bavaria and the Bavarian people".

The order was instituted by law on 11 June 1957. The Prime Minister and the Cabinet can nominate awardees.

Hemmerle, a German jewellery house based in Munich founded in 1893, is the exclusive maker of the Bavarian Order of Merit since it was instituted in 1957.

 Hermann Josef Abs
 Ann-Kristin Achleitner
 Josef Ackermann (journalist)
 Lea Ackermann
 Konrad Adenauer
 Percy Adlon
 Mario Adorf
 Josef Afritsch
 Heinrich Aigner
 Ilse Aigner
 Korbinian Aigner
 Werner Andreas Albert
 Walter Althammer
 Paul Althaus
 Axel von Ambesser
 Tobias Angerer
 Willi Ankermüller
 Gisela Anton
 Evangelos Averoff
 Georg Bachmann
 Rudolf Bachmann
 Friedrich Baethgen
 Michael Ballhaus
 Klaus Barthel
 Władysław Bartoszewski
 Rainer Barzel
 Baudouin of Belgium
 Friedrich L. Bauer
 Heinz Bauer
 Josef Bauer (politician)
 Gustl Bayrhammer
 Augustin Bea
 Walter Becher
 Franz Beckenbauer
 Günther Beckstein
 Heinrich Bedford-Strohm
 Hildegard Behrens
 Werner Beierwaltes
 Heinrich Bender (conductor)
 Pope Benedict XVI
 Lilian Benningsen
 Iris Berben
 Roland Berger
 Senta Berger
 Mathilde Berghofer-Weichner
 Karl-Friedrich Beringer
 Lennart Bernadotte
 Sonja Bernadotte
 Otto Bernheimer
 Christian Bernreiter
 Anton Betz
 Gerhard Bletschacher
 Peter Boenisch
 Willy Bogner Jr.
 Kurt Böhme
 Uwe Brandl
 Eberhard von Brauchitsch
 Klaus Dieter Breitschwert
 Beppo Brem
 Heinrich von Brentano
 Hans Breuer (politician)
 Alois von Brinz
 Dominik Brunner
 Aenne Burda
 Franz Burda
 Adolf Butenandt
 José Carreras
 Karl Carstens
 Sergiu Celibidache
 Jean Charest
 Princess Christa of Thurn and Taxis
 Hans Clarin
 Maurice Couve de Murville
 Ernst Cramer (journalist)
 Herbert Czaja
 Aden Adde
 Thomas Dachser
 Viktor Josef Dammertz
 Diana Damrau
 Adolf Dassler
 Rudolf Dassler
 Colin Davis
 Michael S. Davison
 Jacques Delors
 Albert Dess
 Alfred Dick (politician)
 Paul Diethei
 Helmut Dietl
 Uschi Disl
 Renate Dodell
 Klaus Doldinger
 Julius Döpfner
 Claude Dornier
 Hans Drachsler
 Luis Durnwalder
 Rudolf Eberhard
 Gisela Ehrensperger
 Irenäus Eibl-Eibesfeldt
 Bernd Eichinger
 Hans A. Engelhard
 Matthias Engelsberger
 Kieth Engen
 Karl Engisch
 Annette Erös
 Reinhard Erös
 Kurt Faltlhauser
 Brigitte Fassbaender
 Hans-Josef Fell
 Ludwig Fellermaier
 Markus Ferber
 Wolfgang Fikentscher
 Ernst Otto Fischer
 Max Fischer (politician)
 Friedrich Flick
 Franz Joseph, 9th Prince of Thurn and Taxis
 Ludwig Franz
 Joseph von Fraunhofer
 Gottlob Frick
 Ingo Friedrich
 Karl von Frisch
 Cornelia Froboess
 Karl Fuchs (politician)
 Joachim Fuchsberger
 Joseph-Ernst Graf Fugger von Glött
 Maria Furtwängler
 John Galvin (general)
 Georg Gänswein
 Charles de Gaulle
 Peter Gauweiler
 Martina Gedeck
 Rudolf Geiger
 Willi Geiger (painter)
 Uschi Glas
 Gloria, Princess of Thurn and Taxis
 Peter Glotz
 Nora-Eugenie Gomringer
 Alfons Goppel
 Josef Göppel
 Silvia Görres
 Eveline Gottzein
 Franz Götz (politician)
 Hugo Grau
 Ulrich Grigull
 Monika Gruber
 Max Grundig
 Enoch zu Guttenberg
 Wolfgang Haber
 Peter Häberle
 Otto von Habsburg
 Dietmar Hahlweg
 Ingeborg Hallstein
 Bernhard Häring
 Anja Harteros
 Gerda Hasselfeldt
 Johannes Heesters
 Robert Heger
 Werner Heisenberg
 Florian Henckel von Donnersmarck
 Josef Henselmann
 Wolfgang A. Herrmann
 Friedrich August Freiherr von der Heydte
 Wilfried Hiller
 Friedrich Högner
 Karl Höller
 Christiane Hörbiger
 Melanie Huml
 Mariss Jansons
 Prince Johann Georg of Hohenzollern
 Marcus Junkelmann
 Konstantinos Karamanlis
 Karl, 8th Prince of Löwenstein-Wertheim-Rosenberg
 Ellis Kaut
 Joseph Keilberth
 Paul Kirchhof
 Susanne Klatten
 Carlos Kleiber
 Ewald-Heinrich von Kleist-Schmenzin
 Herbert Knaup
 Herlinde Koelbl
 Juliane Köhler
 Peter Jona Korn
 Platon Kornyljak
 Max Kruse (author)
 Rafael Kubelík
 Reiner Kunze
 Benno Kusche
 Bernard Landry
 Gottfried Landwehr
 Bernhard Langer
 Pascalina Lehnert
 Franz Lehrndorfer
 Robert Lembke
 Harald Lesch
 Sabine Leutheusser-Schnarrenberger
 Hans Ritter von Lex
 Herbert Loebl
 Loriot
 Heidi Lück
 Prince Luitpold of Bavaria (b. 1951)
 Yury Luzhkov
 Lorin Maazel
 Peter Maffay
 Jean Mandel
 Max Mannheimer
 Ursula Männle
 Hubert Markl
 Hellmuth Matiasek
 Walther Meissner
 Otto Meitinger
 Maria-Elisabeth Michel-Beyerle
 Joachim Milberg
 Jürgen Mittelstraß
 Walter Mixa
 Martha Mödl
 Jan Mojto
 Alex Möller
 Horst Möller
 Wolf-Dieter Montag
 Hans Müller (politician)
 Gebhard Müller
 Max Müller (Catholic intellectual)
 Thomas Müller
 Ann Murray
 Anne-Sophie Mutter
 Kent Nagano
 Marlene Neubauer-Woerner
 Christine Neubauer
 Manuel Neuer
 Angelika Niebler
 Theodor Oberländer
 Hermann Oberth
 Carl Orff
 Peter Ostermayr
 Wolfhart Pannenberg
 Paul of Greece
 Max-Josef Pemsel
 Oskar Perron
 Wolfgang Petersen
 Hubertus von Pilgrim
 Susanne Porsche
 Mirjam Pressler
 Otfried Preußler
 Hermann Prey
 Maria Probst
 Karl Pschigode
 Josef Pühringer
 Liselotte Pulver
 Prince Raphael Rainer of Thurn and Taxis
 Georg Ratzinger
 Hanns Reinartz
 Christoph Reiners
 Norbert Reithofer
 Günther Rennert
 Stefan Reuter
 Erich Riedl
 Herbert Rosendorfer
 Marcus H. Rosenmüller
 Philip Rosenthal (industrialist)
 Claudia Roth
 Joseph Rovan
 Sep Ruf
 Ivo Sanader
 Carl Sattler
 Dieter Sattler
 Robert Sauer (mathematician)
 Wolfgang Sawallisch
 Lotte Schädle
 Georg Schäfer
 Anna Schaffelhuber
 Fritz Schäffer
 Franz Schausberger
 Marianne Schech
 Volker Schlöndorff
 Michael Schmaus
 Gerhard Schmidt-Gaden
 Christian Schmidt (politician)
 Horst R. Schmidt
 Heinz Schmidtke
 Franz Schnabel
 Gabriele Schnaut
 Peter Schneider (conductor)
 Hanns-Martin Schneidt
 Jürgen E. Schrempp
 Theobald Schrems
 Wolfgang Schüssel
 Ernst Schwarz (philologist)
 Bastian Schweinsteiger
 Roland Schwing
 Hanna Schygulla
 Hans-Christoph Seebohm
 Horst Seehofer
 Alwin Seifert
 Kurt Semm
 Hans Joachim Sewering
 Ralph Siegel
 Queen Silvia of Sweden
 Erika Simon
 Elke Sommer
 Jutta Speidel
 Friede Springer
 Franz Stadler
 Josef Stangl
 Heinz Starke
 Franz-Ludwig Schenk Graf von Stauffenberg
 Francesco Stefani (film director)
 Gisela Stein
 Erika Steinbach
 Udo Steiner
 Josef Stingl
 Edmund Stoiber
 Franz Josef Strauss
 Florian Streibl
 Max Streibl
 Kurt Suttner
 Peter Tamm
 Jack Terry
 Hans Thamm
 Pierre-Marie Théas
 Heinz Hermann Thiele
 Hertha Töpper
 Luis Trenker
 Konstantinos Tsatsos
 Christian Ude
 Erich Valentin
 Astrid Varnay
 Günter Verheugen
 Michael Verhoeven
 Konstanze Vernon
 Oskar Vierling
 Joseph Vilsmaier
 Rudolf Voderholzer
 Hans-Jochen Vogel
 Kurt Vogel (historian)
 Miriam Vogt
 Karl Vötterle
 Franz Vranitzky
 Hermann Wagner
 Wolfgang Wagner
 Theo Waigel
 Luggi Waldleitner
 Ulrich Walter
 Herbert Walther
 Felix Wankel
 Markus Wasmeier
 Friedrich Weber (general)
 Bernd Weikl
 Grete Weil
 Joseph Wendel
 Friedrich Wetter
 Egon Wiberg
 Bernhard Wicki
 Georg Wieter
 Wolfgang Wild (physicist)
 Ulrich Wilhelm
 Ernst-Ludwig Winnacker
 Fritz Winter
 Notker Wolf
 Hanns Egon Wörlen
 Carl Wurster
 Hans F. Zacher
 Rosel Zech
 Martin Zeil
 Walter Ziegler
 Eduard Zimmermann
 Friedrich Zimmermann

References

External links 

 Searchable database with all recipients

1957 establishments in West Germany
Awards established in 1957
Culture of Bavaria
Orders, decorations, and medals of Bavaria
Orders, decorations, and medals of the states of Germany